Dalton-le-Dale is a small village in County Durham, in England. The parish population taken at the 2011 census was 1,546. It is situated on the old A19 road between Seaham and Murton.
Most of the village is located in a wooded valley bottom, straddling a single road which follows the stream that runs through what is left of Cold Hesledon Dene. Where the road rises to meet the original path of the old A19, there is a small but very fine medieval church which is hidden from the old A19 in a dip. In the opposite direction where the village road to Seaham crosses the stream is Dalden Tower. The pele-tower is the most prominent part of the remains of what was a large medieval manor house complex. The site is a Scheduled Ancient Monument and the tower is Grade II* listed on the National Heritage List for England.

References

External links
 Dalton-le-Dale History Society

Villages in County Durham